Bang Lamphu or spelled Banglampoo and Banglamphu (in the past, it was often misspelled บางลำภู) is a neighbourhood in Bangkok located in Phra Nakhon District. The history of the Bang Lamphu community dates to the establishment of the Rattanakosin Kingdom, or earlier. Bang Lamphu covers an area north of Phra Nakhon in Rattanakosin Island from Phra Athit Road to Samsen Road, which leads toward Dusit District.

History
The name "Bang Lamphu" can mean area of mangrove apple (lamphu is Thai for mangrove apple). Mangrove apples (Sonneratia caseolaris) once flourished along waterways in the area, including the Khlong Bang Lamphu and Chao Phraya River. There are no more mangrove apple trees in the local Santi Chai Prakan Park, since the last one died in 2012 from 2011 Thailand floods, but the name Bang Lamphu is still commonly used to describe the area.

Bang Lamphu became a community prior to the Rattanakosin period. It is the residence of royalty, courtiers, vassals and citizens of many ethnic groups, including Thai, Chinese, Mon and Muslims who settled in the vicinity. Once the Khlong Rop Krung canal was excavated, a pier was established at Bang Lamphu by which goods such as vegetables and fruits could be transported from the Thonburi side. Bang Lamphu also became a major market for overland trade via the Khaosan Road and a number of other roads.

The community is home to likay dancers and Thai musicians and is the birthplace of Montri Tramote, a Thai musician recognized as "master of Thai classical music" and National Artist of Performing arts (Thai music).

Bang Lamphu has become a popular tourist destination, especially for Westerners. The Khaosan and Rambuttri Roads feature tourist attractions. Accommodations and dining are available including guest houses, hostels, restaurants, street foods, bars, cafés, clothes, and travel agencies including Thai massage services. For Thai people, Bang Lamphu is also considered to be a hub for notable school uniform stores.

Bang Lamphu, especially Sip Sam Hang Road, the area opposite Wat Bowonniwet Vihara considered as a center of teenagers in 1950s–60s, like Wang Burapha. Since it was home to many restaurants including cafés and ice cream parlours that offer jukebox and television, which was are rare appliances in those days. Hence, Bang Lamphu and Sip Sam Hang Road was cited in the 1997 Thai heroic bloodshed film Dang Bireley's and Young Gangsters as a backdrop for the characters in street gang battles.

Interesting places

Transportation
 MRT Purple Line: Bang Khun Phrom Station (future extension)
BMTA bus: route A4, S1, 2, 3, 6, 9, 12, 15, 30, 32, 33, 43, 47, 53, 56, 59, 64, 65, 68, 70, 82, 127, 503, 516, 524 
Khlong Bang Lamphu Boat Service: Bang Lamphu Pier (under Norarat Sathan Bridge)
Chao Phraya Express Boat: Phra Arthit Pier (N13)

References

External links
Banglamphu in Lonely Planet

Neighbourhoods of Bangkok
Phra Nakhon district
Tourist attractions in Bangkok